Noohalk Mountain 2099 m (6886 feet) is a mountain in the northernmost Pacific Ranges of the Coast Mountains in British Columbia, Canada.  It is located on the south side of the Bella Coola Valley between Hagensborg and Bella Coola.

Name origin
"Noohalk" is an older transliteration of the local native name for the valley and the river, which has been adopted as the modern name of that people, the Nuxalk, who once had villages all through the adjoining inlets and islands of North and South Bentinck Arms, Dean Channel, Burke Channel and on King Island.

References

Pacific Ranges
Bella Coola Valley
Nuxalk
Two-thousanders of British Columbia
Range 3 Coast Land District